The Prisoners' Earnings Act 1996 (c. 33) is an Act of the Parliament of the United Kingdom. The purpose of the Act was to allow the government to apply deductions and levies on the earnings of prisoners in respect of work carried by the prisoner during his period of detention. The Act was not implemented until 2011.

Provisions
Thus when a prisoner carries out any task or duty within the prison, such as catering or cleaning, and receives payment for this, the government may subject the earnings to deductions for: income tax, national insurance, court order payments, and child maintenance. The monies raised from the deductions and levies are to be used for: payments to voluntary organisations concerned with crime support and prevention; payments to the Consolidated Fund to help pay for the cost of prisons; payments to any of the prisoner's dependants; or payments to an investment account on behalf of the prisoner for their benefit on release. The Act only applies in Great Britain and has no application in Northern Ireland.

History
The Act was passed in 1996; it received royal assent in July of that year, and was expected to be implemented in spring 1997. However, it was not put into force before the 1997 general election. In 2000 the Home Office reported it was studying implementing the Act, whilst in 2008 the Ministry of Justice announced that the complicated nature of the Act suggested it would cost an unreasonable amount to administer.

The Conservative Party stated their intention to implement the Act in their manifesto for the 2010 general election, and secured an agreement with the Liberal Democrats to make it part of their joint coalition agreement. A statutory instrument dated 5 July specified 26 September 2011 as the commencement date for the Act.

As implemented September 2011, the Act will result in a 40% pay cut for 500 prisoners, and is expected to raise up to £1m a year.

See also
UK labour law

Notes

United Kingdom Acts of Parliament 1996